Tijana Ajduković (born 3 June 1991) is a Serbian professional women's basketball player who plays for USK Praha (women's basketball) of the Czech League. She also represents the Serbian national basketball team.

International career
She represented Serbian national basketball team at the EuroBasket 2015 in Budapest where they won the gold medal, and qualified for the 2016 Olympics, first in the history for the Serbian team.

References

External links
 Tijana Ajduković at eurobasket.com
 Tijana Ajduković at fiba.com
 Tijana Ajduković at fibaeurope.com
 Tijana Ajduković at wbcs.ru
 

1991 births
Living people
Serbian women's basketball players
People from Bačka Topola
Centers (basketball)
ŽKK Vršac players
ŽKK Spartak Subotica players
Serbian expatriate basketball people in Hungary
Serbian expatriate basketball people in Poland
Serbian expatriate basketball people in Italy
Serbian expatriate basketball people in the Czech Republic
European champions for Serbia
Mediterranean Games silver medalists for Serbia
Competitors at the 2009 Mediterranean Games
Mediterranean Games medalists in basketball